Bozlu may refer to:
Bozlu, Iran
Bozlu, Kalbajar
Bozlu, Lachin